Caramel is the second studio-album of New Zealand psychedelic pop musician Connan Mockasin, released in November 2013.

Mockasin has said that in terms of the process of writing the album:"It's just ideas in my head that I put together, and later on it might make more sense. But I don't think about the meaning at the time. Or I'm not aware of it."

As of January 2014, the album has received an overall score of 70 on Metacritic, indicating generally favourable reviews. Pitchfork gave the album 6.7 out of 10, concluding: "The word "caramel" is most readily embodied by this music's sensual, flirtatious leanings. Unfortunately, sometimes it seems to just mean "slow", i.e. the pace of swimming through caramel." The New Zealand Listener gave the album a positive review, noting that although the album is strongly influenced by others, "Mockasin is writing his own recipe, and although his Caramel may be an acquired taste for some, it is an undeniably crucial concoction."

Track listing

Chart positions

References

External links
Caramel  on the Mexican Summer website
Caramel on the Because Music website
Caramel on the Phantasy website

Connan Mockasin albums
2013 albums